Alexander Tschäppät (16 April 1952 – 4 May 2018) was a Swiss politician. Tschäppät was a member of the Social Democratic Party of Switzerland. He has been a member of the National Council of Switzerland from 1991 to 2003 and again 2011 to 2018. He was mayor (Stadtpräsident) of Bern 2005 until 2016.

Biography
Tschäppät was born on 16 April 1952 in Bern to Reynold Tschäppät and Lily Bürki.

See also
 Politics of Switzerland

References

External links

1952 births
2018 deaths
Mayors of Bern
Social Democratic Party of Switzerland politicians
Deaths from cancer in Switzerland